Fuzhou University (FZU ) is a university located in Fuzhou, Fujian, China. Split into two campuses by the Min River, Fuzhou University's Old Campus is located on the north bank of the river in the western part of Fuzhou City, while the New Campus is located on the edge of the city on the south bank, at the base of Qi Mountain.

The university is in the fields of science and engineering nationally. It also has similar programs such as economics, management, arts and law. The university is part of the PRC national programs of Double First Class University Plan and former Project 211 to enhance the development of the tertiary education system in mainland China. It is a Chinese state Double First Class University identified by the Ministry of Education of China.

Administration

Founded in 1958, Fuzhou University is one of the national key universities that are selected into the "Double First Class University Plan" and former “211 Project”, Chinese government programs to support selected universities for their further rapid development.

Now Fuzhou University covers more than 333 hectares, including several campuses such as Yishan campus, Qishan campus, Tongpan campus and the Academy of Arts and Design in Xiamen. The main running campus is located in Qishan campus of the University Town of Fuzhou Region. There are 19 schools in Fuzhou University mainly for undergraduate education and two independently operated colleges—Zhicheng College and Yangguang College. There are 4 post-doctoral research stations, 9 doctoral degree programmes for the first-rank disciplines, 54 doctoral degree programmes for the second-rank disciplines, 29 master's degree programmes for the first-rank disciplines and 168 master's degree programmes for the second-rank disciplines and 11 professional degree authorization stations.

Fuzhou University has been approved by the Ministry of Education to offer undergraduate and postgraduate programmes to students from Hong Kong, 
Macao, Taiwan regions and foreign countries. At present, there are about 50,000 students in Fuzhou University, including about over 5,200 doctoral 
and master's degree seekers. Since its establishment, about 200,000 students graduated from Fuzhou University, including full-time doctoral and 
master's degree students as well as those with the bachelor's degrees and associate degrees.

Fuzhou University has been taking great efforts to develop the cooperation and exchange. The international and national academic conferences have 
been conducted successfully in Fuzhou University so that the social academic influence from Fuzhou University has been enhanced. Academic exchanges 
on science, teaching and culture with Taiwan, Hong Kong and Macao regions have been actively carried out. The university is also positively engaged 
in promoting the exchanges between Chinese civilization and western civilization. “Library of the Western Belvedere”, the first western works center 
in China, and Institute of International Sinology have been established. The favorable collaborative relationship has been established with more than 
20 universities in different countries, such as the United States, the United Kingdom, Germany, France, Russia, Japan, South Korea and so on. Fuzhou 
University has become an important window of scientific, academic, educational and cultural exchanges in Fujian Province.

Faculties and Schools 
Application Technology and Continuing Education Institute
College of Architecture
College of Biological Science and Engineering
College of Chemistry
College of Civil Engineering
College of Electrical Engineering and Automation
College of Engineering and Applied Technology
College of Environment and Resources
College of Foreign Languages
College of Humanities and Social Sciences
College of Materials Science and Engineering
College of Mathematics and Computer Science
College of Mechanical Engineering and Automation
College of Physics and Information Engineering
College of Marine
College of Software
College of Zijin Mining
Law School
School of Chemical Engineering
School of Economics and Management
School of Foreign Languages
School of Marxism
Xiamen Academy of Arts and Design
Yango College
Zhicheng College

References

External links

Fuzhou University 
Fuzhou University 

 
Project 211
Universities and colleges in Fujian
Educational institutions established in 1958
1958 establishments in China